Disulfur dioxide, dimeric sulfur monoxide or SO dimer is an oxide of sulfur with the formula S2O2. The solid is unstable with a lifetime of a few seconds at room temperature.

Structure
Disulfur dioxide adopts a cis planar structure with C2v symmetry. The S−O bond length is 145.8 pm, shorter than in sulfur monoxide. The S−S bond length is 202.45 pm and the O−S−S angle is 112.7°.  S2O2 has a dipole moment of 3.17 D. It is an asymmetric top molecule.

Formation
Sulfur monoxide (SO) converts to disulfur dioxide (S2O2) spontaneously and reversibly. So the substance can be generated by methods that produce sulfur monoxide. Disulfur dioxide has also been formed by an electric discharge in sulfur dioxide. Another laboratory procedure is to react oxygen atoms with carbonyl sulfide or carbon disulfide vapour.

Although most forms of elemental sulfur (S8 and other rings and chains) do not combine with SO2, atomic sulfur does so to form sulfur monoxide, which dimerizes:
S + SO2 → S2O2 ⇌ 2 SO

Disulfur dioxide is also produced upon a microwave discharge in sulfur dioxide diluted in helium.

Disulfur dioxide is formed transiently when hydrogen sulfide and oxygen undergo flash photolysis.

Properties

Disulfur dioxide absorbs at 320–400 nm, as observed of the Venusian atmosphere, and is believed to have contributed to the greenhouse effect on that planet.

Reactions
Although disulfur dioxide exists in equilibrium with sulfur monoxide, it also reacts with sulfur monoxide to form sulfur dioxide and disulfur monoxide.

Complexes
S2O2 can be a ligand with transition metals. It binds in the η2-S–S position with both sulfur atoms linked to the metal atom. This was first shown in 2003. The bis(trimethylphosphine) thiirane S-oxide complex of platinum, when heated in toluene at 110 °C loses ethylene, and forms a complex with S2O2: (Ph3P)2Pt(S2O2). Iridium atoms can also form a complex: cis-[(dppe)2IrS2]Cl with sodium periodate oxidizes to [(dppe)2IrS2O] and then to [(dppe)2IrS2O2], with dppe being 1,2-bis(diphenylphosphino)ethane. This substance has the S2O2 in a cis position.  The same conditions can make a trans complex, but this contains two separate SO radicals instead. The iridium complex can be decomposed with triphenylphosphine to form triphenylphosphine oxide and triphenylphosphine sulfide.

Anion
The  anion has been observed in the gas phase.  It may adopt a trigonal shape akin to SO3.

Spectrum

Microwave

In the Solar System 
There is a some evidence that disulfur dioxide may be a small component in the atmosphere of Venus, and that it may substantially contribute of the planet's severe greenhouse effect. It is not found in any substantive quantity in Earth's atmosphere.

References

Sulfur oxides
Sulfur(II) compounds